The stere or stère (st) is a unit of volume in the original metric system equal to one cubic metre. The stere is typically used for measuring large quantities of firewood or other cut wood,<ref>{{Cite web |last=Thierry Thomasset |title=Le stère |url=http://www.utc.fr/~tthomass/Themes/Unites/unites/infos/stere/Le%20stere.pdf |access-date=2011-03-21 |website=Tout sur les unités de mesure [All about the units of measure] |publisher=Université de Technologie de Compiègne |language=French}}</ref> while the cubic meter is used for uncut wood.  The name was coined from the Greek στερεός stereós, "solid", in 1795 in France as a metric analogue to the cord. The unit was introduced to remove regional disparities of this former unit, for which the length could vary greatly from 6 to 13.5 m. It is not part of the modern metric system (SI) and is no longer a legal unit in France, but remains used in the commerce of firewood. 
Background
The correspondence between stere and cubic meter of stacked wood is imprecise because it depends on the length of the logs used and on how irregular they are. The stere corresponds to 1 m3 of wood, made exclusively with logs of 1 m in length, all stacked parallel and neatly arranged. If the length of the logs is less than 1 m, the volume of visible wood decreases because the voids are better occupied. Thus the "stere" no longer corresponds to 1 m3, but to 0.8 m3 for logs of 50 cm, 0.7 m3 for logs of 33 cm and 0.6 m3 for logs of 25 cm.

In Dutch and German, a closely related unit called kuub (Dutch), short for kubieke meter,  or "Kubikmeter" (German) which differs from a stere. Whereas a "kuub" or "Kubikmeter" is a solid cubic metre, as it was traditionally used for wood, a stere (in German: Raummeter) is a cubic metre pile of woodblocks. A stere or Raummeter is less than a kuub or full cubic metre of wood, because the spaces between the woodblocks are included in a stere, while they do not count towards a kuub or Kubikmeter. In Finnish, the same unit is known as motti (from Swedish mått'', "measure").

The stere as used in contexts outside the timber industry is not subject to the same ambiguity. In particular, stere and kilostere are sometimes used in hydrology, as the kilostere (1000 m3 or megalitre) is a slightly smaller metric analogue of an acre-foot (approximately 1233 m3), similar to the relationship of the tonne to the short ton.

See also

 Board foot
 Cord
 Cubic ton
 Faggot (unit)
 Forest product
 Hoppus foot
 List of unusual units of measurement
 Metric units
 Petrograd Standard 
 Units of measurement

References

Units of volume
Non-SI metric units
Logging

ja:ステール